Gynautocera is a genus of moths of the family Zygaenidae.

Species
Gynautocera buruensis
Gynautocera celebensis
Gynautocera djilolensis
Gynautocera fraterna
Gynautocera papilionaria
Gynautocera pavo
Gynautocera philippinensis
Gynautocera philomela
Gynautocera rara
Gynautocera reducta
Gynautocera rubriscutellata
Gynautocera selene
Gynautocera virescens
Gynautocera zara

Chalcosiinae
Zygaenidae genera